Lechenaultia linarioides, commonly named yellow leschenaultia, is a species of flowering plant in the family Goodeniaceae and is endemic to near-coastal areas in the west of Western Australia. It is a sprawling subshrub with many tangled branches, narrow, crowded, rather fleshy leaves, and yellow and deep pink to purplish red flowers.

Description

Taxonomy
Lechenaultia linarioides was first formally described in 1839 by Augustin Pyramus de Candolle in Prodromus Systematis Naturalis Regni Vegetabilis from specimens collected in the Swan River Colony by James Drummond. The specific epithet (linarioides) means "Linaria-like".

Distribution and habitat
Yellow leschenaultia usually grows in heath or scrub and is found in near-coastal areas of Western Australia from Shark Bay to Perth.

Conservation status
This leschenaultia is listed as "not threatened" by the Government of Western Australia Department of Biodiversity, Conservation and Attractions.

References

External links

Asterales of Australia
linarioides
Eudicots of Western Australia
Plants described in 1839
Taxa named by Augustin Pyramus de Candolle